The Marghzar Cricket Ground is a cricket ground in Islamabad, Pakistan located near the Saidpur village. The first recorded match on the ground was in the 1988/89 season. The ground has hosted more than forty first-class matches since 1993. It was selected as a venue to host a match in the 2016–17 Quaid-e-Azam Trophy.

See also
 List of cricket grounds in Pakistan

References

External links
Marghzar Cricket Ground at CricketArchive

Cricket grounds in Pakistan
1988 establishments in Pakistan